Rolta, is an Indian multinational technology company, headquartered in Mumbai, India. The company focuses on IT, Business Intelligence and BigData Analytics, Geographic data and information and Engineering. The company is listed on the Bombay Stock Exchange and National Stock Exchange of India. The company's Global depository receipt's are listed on the Main Board of the London Stock Exchange. The company's ‘Senior Notes’ are listed on the Singapore Stock Exchange.

History 
The company was founded on 29 June 1989 by Kamal K. singh.

References

External links

Information technology consulting firms of India
International information technology consulting firms
Information technology companies of India
Multinational companies headquartered in India
Indian brands
Companies listed on the National Stock Exchange of India
Companies listed on the Bombay Stock Exchange